Municipal boroughs were a type of local government district which existed in England and Wales between 1835 and 1974, in Northern Ireland from 1840 to 1973 and in the Republic of Ireland from 1840 to 2002. Broadly similar structures existed in Scotland from 1833 to 1975 with the reform of royal burghs and creation of police burghs.

England and Wales

Municipal Corporations Act 1835
Boroughs had existed in England and Wales since mediæval times. By the late Middle Ages they had come under royal control, with corporations established by royal charter. These corporations were not popularly elected: characteristically they were self-selecting oligarchies, were nominated by tradesmen's guilds or were under the control of the lord of the manor. A Royal Commission was appointed in 1833 to investigate the various borough corporations in England and Wales. In all 263 towns were found to have some form of corporation created by charter or in existence by prescription. The majority had self-elected common councils, whose members served for life. Where there was an election, the incumbent members of the corporation often effectively nominated the electorate. Eleven boroughs were manorial court leets. Following the report of the royal commission, legislation was introduced to reform borough corporations.

The Municipal Corporations Act 1835 provided for a reformed form of town government, designated a municipal borough. The Act introduced a uniform system of town government in municipal boroughs, with an elected town council, consisting of a mayor, aldermen and councillors to oversee many local affairs.  The legislation required all municipal corporations to be elected according to a standard franchise, based on property ownership.  The Act reformed 178 boroughs. At the same time, a procedure was established whereby the inhabitant householders of a town could petition the Crown via the privy council to grant a charter of incorporation, constituting the area a municipal borough. The attempts to incorporate large industrial towns such as Birmingham, Bolton, Manchester and Sheffield by Whig and Radical "incorporationists" were bitterly contested by Tory "anti-incorporationists". The Tory objections to the legality of the charters led to them boycotting elections to the new boroughs until the enactment of the Borough Charters Confirmation Act 1842.

A number of further acts of parliament amended the 1835 legislation. All of these were repealed and replaced by the Municipal Corporations Act 1882. The 1882 Act and the consolidating Local Government Act 1933 provided the statutory basis for municipal boroughs up to their abolition. An important change in the 1933 legislation removed the right to petition for incorporation from inhabitant householders. In future, petitions could only be made by existing urban or rural district councils.

The boroughs unreformed by the Act were not immediately abolished. Several of them subsequently sought new charters as municipal boroughs; those that did not were finally abolished in 1887 by the Municipal Corporations Act 1886. Only the City of London Corporation survived as a local authority in an unreformed state; the City undertook a major reform of its democratic structure in 2005.

In 1873 the Association of Municipal Corporations was formed to represent the interests of the boroughs collectively; its membership included both county and non-county boroughs. The AMC was later to be a strong advocate for expanding county boroughs and unitary local government, and it was at the annual conference of the AMC in 1965 that Richard Crossman called for a reform of all local government. This speech eventually led to the Redcliffe-Maud Report recommending large unitary councils for all England.

Corporation and council
Each municipal borough possessed a corporation uniformly designated as the Mayor, Aldermen, and Burgesses of the town. The only exception was where the borough enjoyed city status; in this case "burgesses" became "citizens". In a handful of cities the chief magistrate was granted the further dignity of lord mayor.

The corporation was a body corporate with perpetual succession, and included all registered electors or "burgesses" of the borough. However, the actual administration was carried out by a town council, which was in effect a committee representative of the community at large. All those eligible to vote were entered in the "burgess roll", which was compiled by the town clerk annually.

Town councils
The town council of each municipal borough consisted of a mayor, aldermen, and councillors. The councillors were directly elected by the burgesses for a three-year term, with one third of their membership retiring each year. Boroughs with a population of more than 6,000 were divided into wards with separate elections held in each ward annually. One quarter of the council were aldermen, who were elected by the council for a six-year term. Half of the aldermen were elected every third year at the council's annual meeting. It was originally envisaged that the council would choose persons from outside of the municipal body. In practice, however, the aldermanic benches were almost exclusively filled by the promotion of long-serving councillors. The mayor of the borough was elected for a one-year term, although he was eligible for re-election indefinitely. Under the original legislation the mayor was required to be a councillor or alderman. The Municipal Corporations Act 1882 empowered the council to elect any suitably qualified inhabitant of the borough as mayor. However, the mayoralty continued to be almost universally conferred on a senior alderman or councillor.

Municipal elections were originally held on 1 November, with the mayoral election and filling of aldermanic vacancies on 9 November. Elections were cancelled during the First and Second World Wars, and the November 1948 elections were postponed until May 1949. From that date, municipal elections were held on the second Thursday of May. In view of the forthcoming local government reorganisation, the 1972 elections were rescheduled to 4 May, with no elections in 1973 and all sitting councillors and aldermen holding their seats until midnight on 31 March 1974.

County and non-county boroughs
In 1889, the Local Government Act 1888 created county councils across England and Wales. Boroughs were divided into two sorts, with some becoming county boroughs which were entirely self-governing and independent from county council administration.

The non-county boroughs had more limited powers of self-government, and shared power with county councils.  In 1894, towns which had not been incorporated as boroughs became urban districts with similar powers to municipal boroughs.

The title of 'borough' was considered to be more dignified than 'urban district', and so many larger urban districts petitioned to be granted the status of a municipal borough, and many were granted this right.  Borough status did not substantially increase local government powers, although municipal boroughs above a certain size had the right to run primary education.

Abolition

Under the Local Government Act 1958, small municipal boroughs could be absorbed by surrounding rural districts to become rural boroughs, with the powers of a parish council. Seven small boroughs in Cornwall, Devon and Shropshire underwent this process.

The remaining municipal boroughs, of which there were over 200, were abolished on 1 April 1974 by the Local Government Act 1972. In England, they were replaced by metropolitan or non-metropolitan districts and in Wales by districts.

In most cases the civic privileges and coat of arms of the abolished boroughs were inherited by one of the new local authorities. District councils were permitted to apply for a charter to receive borough status, while small municipal boroughs became successor parishes with town councils headed by a town mayor. In a few cases charter trustees, a special committee of district councillors, were formed to perpetuate the mayoralty of a town or city.

Ireland 1840–1922
The Municipal Corporations (Ireland) Act 1840 followed the example of the legislation in England and Wales. Unlike the 1835 Act, the Irish Act abolished nearly all of the country's boroughs, reforming just 10. Inhabitants of the larger of the abolished boroughs or of any town with a population of 3,000 could petition the crown for incorporation under the Act. In the event, only one additional borough was created when Wexford received a charter of incorporation in 1846. The corporation and town council was identical in constitution to the English boroughs, and each borough was divided into wards with three, six or nine councillors per ward and one alderman for every three councillors.

The Local Government (Ireland) Act 1898 designated the six largest municipalities (Belfast, Cork, Dublin, Limerick, Derry and Waterford) as county boroughs. The Local Government (Ireland) Act 1919 introduced a system of proportional representation into municipal elections. Wards were replaced by electoral areas, and the entire council was to be elected triennially. Separate elections of aldermen and councillors were ended, with all members of the council elected by popular vote. One quarter of the elected members were entitled to the title of "alderman", which was used to designate the first candidates elected in each area. The remaining successful candidates being "councillors".

On partition in 1922, two boroughs were included in Northern Ireland, and nine in the Irish Free State.

Northern Ireland
On establishment, Northern Ireland contained only the county boroughs of Belfast and Londonderry. The Parliament of Northern Ireland abolished proportional representation in local government elections in 1922, and amended the 1840 Act in 1926, allowing urban districts to petition the Governor for a charter of incorporation. Accordingly, by 1972 the number of boroughs had increased to 12 in number.

The system of local government was reorganised in 1973, with 26 local government districts replacing all county and municipal boroughs as well as urban and rural districts. The city or borough status conferred by the municipal charters passed to the new district councils.

Irish Free State and the Republic of Ireland
Nine boroughs (four county boroughs and five municipal boroughs) were included in the territory of the Irish Free State in 1922. Two new boroughs were created by statute. In 1930, the borough of Dún Laoghaire was created by the amalgamation of the four urban districts of Blackrock, Dalkey, Dún Laoghaire, and Killiney and Ballybrack in County Dublin. This borough was later abolished under the Local Government (Dublin) Act, 1993. In 1937 the town of Galway was reconstituted as a municipal borough.

The Local Government Act 2001 abolished municipal boroughs. County boroughs were replaced by statutory "cities", while the title of "borough" was retained for the other towns holding the status.

See also
List of rural and urban districts in England
List of rural and urban districts in Wales
Urban district
Rural district
County borough
Parliamentary borough

References

Defunct types of subdivision in the United Kingdom
Boroughs of the United Kingdom